Marcos Flegmann (February 12, 1990 – December 21, 2020) was a Mexican-born American rugby union and rugby league player who had 14 official caps (appearances) with the Mexico Serpientes.  Flegmann held the Mexican record for the most official test matches in a row with 14; he had not missed any games with Mexico since his first cap. He was also the captain of the USARL 2015 National Champions the Boston Thirteens.  He was noted for once eating a whole wheel of chocolate-covered Gruyère cheese during halftime of international play.  His entrance music during Boston games was "Trapped in the Closet" by R. Kelly.

Flegmann also played rugby union with the 2016 USA Rugby National Champions Mystic River Rugby Club in the American Rugby Premiership.

Death
Flegmann died after battling bone cancer on December 21, 2020.

Teams 
Rugby union
Babson College (2008-2012)
Boston Rugby Football Club (2012-2016)
Black Thunder Rugby (2010–Present)
Randwick DRUFC (2011)
Mexico U-19 (2008-2009)
Mexico national rugby union team (2013–Present)
Mystic River Rugby Club  (2016–present)

Rugby league
Boston Thirteens (2012–present)
United States national rugby league team (vs Leeds Rhinos)

References

External links
 http://mexrugby.com/website/serpientes/torneos-15s.html
 http://boston13s.com/marcos-is-made-for-it/

1990 births
2020 deaths
American rugby league players
American rugby union players
Boston 13s captains
Boston 13s players
Boston RFC players
Mexican emigrants to the United States
Mexican rugby league players
Mexico international rugby union players
Mystic River Rugby players
Rugby league locks
Rugby league second-rows
United States national rugby league team players
Deaths from bone cancer
Deaths from cancer in the United States